Earl Hunt may refer to:
Earl B. Hunt (1933–2016), American psychologist and computer scientist
Earl Gladstone Hunt Jr. (1918–2005), American Methodist pastor and evangelist